Horama zapata is a moth of the subfamily Arctiinae. It was described by Robert E. Dietz IV and W. Donald Duckworth in 1976. It is found on Cuba and the Bahamas.

References

Euchromiina
Moths described in 1976